WRFS (105.1 FM) is a radio station licensed to serve the community of Rockford, Alabama. The station is owned by Marble City Media, LLC and airs a classic hits format.

The station was assigned the WRFS call letters by the Federal Communications Commission on January 22, 2014.

References

External links
Official Website

RFS (FM)
Radio stations established in 2015
2015 establishments in Alabama
Classic hits radio stations in the United States
Coosa County, Alabama